Saoud Al Khater (Arabic:سعود الخاطر) (born 9 April 1991) is a Qatari footballer. He currently plays for Al-Wakrah.

References

External links
 

Qatari footballers
1991 births
Living people
El Jaish SC players
Al-Wakrah SC players
Al-Duhail SC players
Al-Rayyan SC players
Al-Sailiya SC players
Qatar Stars League players
Association football goalkeepers